Penry may refer to:

Surname 
David Penry-Davey (1942–2015), Judge of the High Court of England and Wales
John Penry (1559–1593), Welsh Protestant
Johnny Paul Penry (born 1956), American rapist
Josh Penry (born 1976) American politician
Mary Penry (1735–1804), Welsh-born woman in colonial Pennsylvania
Peter Penry-Jones (1938–2009), Welsh actor
Richard Allen Penry (1948–1994), United States Army soldier
Rupert Penry-Jones (born 1970), English actor

Given name 
Penry Powell Palfrey (1830–1902), British stained glass designer and painter
Penry Williams (1866–1945), English politician 
Penry Williams (artist) (1802–1885), Welsh artist
Penry Williams (historian) (1925-2013), Welsh historian
Penry Gustavson (born 1970), American politician

See also 
Penry v. Johnson, 532 U.S. 782 (2001), is a United States Supreme Court
Penry v. Lynaugh, 492 U.S. 302 (1989), sanctioned the death penalty for mentally disabled offenders